Michigan's 11th congressional district election was held on November 6, 2012, for a seat in the 113th United States Congress alongside a presidential election, other elections to the United States House of Representatives and elections for class I of the United States Senate. In Michigan, all of the state's 14 congressional seats were at stake. Michigan's junior United States Senator Debbie Stabenow is running for re-election.  Additionally, all 110 seats in the Michigan House of Representatives were at stake.

In reapportionment done following the 2010 United States Census, the district was redrawn to favor then Congressman Thaddeus McCotter.

The election was held alongside a special election to fill a vacancy in Michigan's 11th congressional district caused by the July 6, 2012 resignation of Republican member of the United States House of Representatives Thaddeus McCotter. The primary for the special election was held on September 5, 2012.

Background
After a failed, short-lived presidential campaign, McCotter opted to run for 6th term in the House. On May 25, 2012, it was announced that McCotter had fallen short of the required 1,000 signatures to appear on the ballot for the August 7 GOP primary.

On May 29, 2012, McCotter announced his intentions to seek the GOP nomination as write-in candidate. McCotter ended his write-in campaign shortly after on June 2, 2012.

McCotter resigned from Congress on July 6, 2012. On August 11, 2012, Michigan Attorney General Bill Schuette announced charges against four former McCotter staff aides, for their roles in obtaining and submitting fraudulent election petitions.

Primary election

Republican
After McCotter's resignation, the only other Republican who qualified for the primary ballot was political novice/Tea Party activist  Kerry Bentivolio.

After McCotter's resignation, several candidates considered mounting a write-in campaign, including Birmingham-based foreclosure attorney David Trott, former state Rep. Andrew "Rocky" Raczkowski, state Sen. Mike Kowall of White Lake and former Oakland County Republican Party Chairman Paul Welday. Eventually, State GOP leaders rallied around former state Sen. Nancy Cassis.

Candidates
Kerry Bentivolio
Nancy Cassis (write-in)

Declined/Withdrew
David Trott
Andy Raczkowski
Mike Kowall
Paul Welday

Disqualified from Ballot
Thad McCotter

Results

Democratic
Only two candidates, both with low name recognition qualified for the Democratic Primary ballot before McCotter's resignation.  They were Dr. Syed Taj, a member of the Canton Township Board of Trustees and Bill Roberts, a Lyndon LaRouche activist whose main goal was to impeach President Barack Obama and campaigned with posters with Obama having a mustache similar to Adolf Hitler.

Results

General election

Candidates
Kerry Bentivolio, Republican nominee
Syed Taj, Democratic Nominee
 Steven Paul Duke, Green Party nominee
John J. Tartar, Libertarian Party nominee
William Daniel Johnson, Natural Law Party nominee

Results

References

10th congressional district
Michigan 11
2012 11 special